is a novel written by Natsume Sōseki in 1909, first published in serial form in the Japanese newspaper Asahi Shimbun. It was translated into English by Norma Moore Field in 1978.

Plot
The novel starts off with Daisuke, the protagonist, waking up and staring at the ceiling with his hand on his heart, feeling for his heartbeat. He is a son of a wealthy family. He is a polyglot and well-read, and has graduated from a prestigious university. At the time in Japan universities were a new element in society, and the government had to hire Western professors in order to teach students. But despite graduating, he is now thirty years old and unemployed, and depends on his father's wealth.

One day, he meets his university friends, Hiraoka and Terao. Hiraoka had a career in the Japanese civil service but he fought with his boss and was fired for mismanaging finance. Terao intended to become a world-famous novelist but ended up in a part-time job translating works and writing short articles for low wages. These two friends represent a world he feels completely detached from, and he questions their reasons for working.

Daisuke does not have much attachment to traditional Japanese society since his education has given him the knowledge that the world is too vast to be confined to the boundaries delineated by tradition. Furthermore, he cannot form any connection to modern society which views education merely as the prelude to success in a bureaucratic order. Because of Daisuke's detachment from everything, his family decides to support him financially for the rest of his life if he marries a woman who is chosen by the family. However, Daisuke decides not to get any support from his family and not get married. He eventually falls in love with Michiyo, the wife of Hiraoka.

Film adaptations
Sorekara was adapted into a film in 1985, by director Yoshimitsu Morita.

References

External links
 Complete Japanese text on aozora.gr.jp

1909 Japanese novels
Novels by Natsume Sōseki
Novels set in Japan
Japanese novels adapted into films
Japanese serial novels